Elie El-Zakhem is a Lebanon international rugby league footballer who plays as a  for the Sydney Roosters in the NRL.

Career
El-Zakhem made his international debut for Lebanon in their 56-14 loss to Fiji in the 2019 Pacific Test.

References

External links
Canterbury-Bankstown profile

1998 births
Living people
Australian rugby league players
Lebanon national rugby league team players
Rugby league players from Sydney
Rugby league props